Benson Kiplagat Seurei (born 27 March 1984) is a Kenyan-born Bahraini middle-distance runner competing primarily in the 1500 metres. He represented his country in the 1500 metres at the 2015 World Championships in Beijing without advancing from the first round. In 2019, he competed in the men's marathon at the 2019 World Athletics Championships held in Doha, Qatar. He did not finish his race.

Competition record

1Representing Asia-Pacific

Personal bests
Outdoor
800 metres – 1:45.67 (Bottrop 2012)
1000 metres – 2:16.39 (Linz 2012)
1500 metres – 3:31.61 (Monaco 2012)
One mile – 3:56.78 (Heidelberg 2013)
3000 metres – 7:40.56 (Zagreb 2013)
3000 metres steeplechase – 8:37.3 (Nairobi 2006)
Indoor
800 metres – 1:48.37 (Ludwigshafen 2012)
1000 metres – 2:20.14 (Prague 2009)
1500 metres – 3:37.08 (Doha 2016)
3000 metres – 7:48.96 (Linz 2012)

References

1984 births
Living people
Place of birth missing (living people)
Bahraini male middle-distance runners
Kenyan male steeplechase runners
Kenyan emigrants to Bahrain
World Athletics Championships athletes for Bahrain
Athletes (track and field) at the 2014 Asian Games
Kenyan male middle-distance runners
Athletes (track and field) at the 2016 Summer Olympics
Olympic athletes of Bahrain
Asian Games competitors for Bahrain
Naturalized citizens of Bahrain